The Keystone Work Center in Medicine Bow National Forest near Albany, Wyoming was built in 1941. It was listed on the National Register of Historic Places in 1994 for its architecture. It was designed by architects of the U.S. Forest Service in a standard plan using log cabin rustic style.

See also
Brush Creek Work Center, also NRHP-listed in Medicine Bow National Forest

References

External links
Keystone Work Center, at Wyoming State Historic Preservation Office

Government buildings completed in 1941
Office buildings completed in 1941
United States Forest Service architecture
Park buildings and structures on the National Register of Historic Places in Wyoming
Buildings and structures in Albany County, Wyoming
Historic districts on the National Register of Historic Places in Wyoming
National Register of Historic Places in Albany County, Wyoming